Monnikenhuize was a multi-use stadium in Arnhem, Netherlands.  It was used mostly for football matches and hosted the home matches of SBV Vitesse. The stadium was able to hold 7,500 people. The stadium was opened in 1915.  It was closed in 1950 when Nieuw Monnikenhuize opened.

For the 1928 Summer Olympics in Amsterdam, it hosted the consolation first round match between Chile and Mexico on 5 June 1928.

References
FIFA.com 1928 Summer Olympic CHI-MEX results.
RSSF.com results of the 1928 Summer Olympics football tournament results.

Venues of the 1928 Summer Olympics
Olympic football venues
Defunct football venues in the Netherlands
SBV Vitesse
Sports venues in Arnhem
Sports venues completed in 1915
1915 establishments in the Netherlands
1950 disestablishments in the Netherlands
20th-century architecture in the Netherlands